James Cameron (born 1954) is a Canadian film director.

James Cameron may also refer to:

 James Cameron (activist) (1914–2006), American civil-rights activist
 James Cameron (American football) (1938–1995), American College football coach
 James Cameron (footballer) (1868–1934), Scottish footballer
 James Cameron (journalist) (1911–1985), British journalist
 James Cameron (missionary) (1799–1875), Scottish artisan missionary
 James Cameron (scientist) (1930–2003), British forensic scientist involved in the Lindy Chamberlain case
 James Cameron (South African cricketer) (born 1979), former South African cricketer
 James Cameron (Union colonel) (1800–1861), American Union Army colonel
 James Cameron (Victorian politician) (1846–1922), Australian politician
 James Cameron (Zimbabwean cricketer) (born 1986), Zimbabwean cricketer
 J. Donald Cameron (1833–1918), American politician
 James R. Cameron (born 1929), American historian and educator
 James W. Cameron (1913–2010), American professor and citrus breeder
 Jim Cameron (Australian footballer) (1881–1941), Australian rules footballer
 Jim Cameron (politician) (1930–2002), Australian politician
 Jim Cameron (Scottish footballer) (born 1946), Scottish footballer
 Jim Cameron (water polo), former water polo representative from New Zealand
 Jimmy Cameron (1923–1994), Jamaican cricketer
 James Clephane-Cameron (born 1985), British poet
 James Duke Cameron (1925–2003), justice of the Supreme Court of Arizona
 James Cameron-Dow (born 1990), South African cricketer